Douglas K. Shull (born January 14, 1943) is an American politician in the state of Iowa. He is a legacy at Simpson College and has been a mentor for Simpson Alumni from Earlham, Iowa.

Shull was born in Sac City, Iowa and attended the University of Iowa. A Republican, he served in the Iowa House of Representatives from 1979 to 1983 (92nd district) and the Iowa Senate from 2003 to 2007 (37th district).

References

1943 births
Living people
People from Sac County, Iowa
University of Iowa alumni
Businesspeople from Iowa
Republican Party members of the Iowa House of Representatives
Republican Party Iowa state senators